Chappell Roan (born 1998) is an American singer and songwriter based in Los Angeles. A pop music artist, she writes most of her own songs and has described her style as "dark pop with ballad undertones."

When she was 17 years old, Roan uploaded a song titled "Die Young" to YouTube, leading Atlantic Records to sign her to the label. In summer 2020, she released a song titled "Pink Pony Club", which was later described as "the Song of Summer 2021" in Vulture. , she is signed to Island Records after a stint as an independent artist.

Early life 
Chappell Roan was born Kayleigh Rose Amstutz in Willard, Missouri. She took the stage name Chappell Roan in honor of her grandfather, Dennis K. Chappell, who died of brain cancer in 2016; his favorite song was "The Strawberry Roan". She has expressed dislike for her real name.

When she was 10 or 11, she began playing the piano. At 14 or 15 years old, she began uploading covers of songs to YouTube, drawing attention from various record labels. When she entered her teen years she began songwriting. When she was 17 years old, she uploaded an original song titled "Die Young", and was subsequently signed to Atlantic Records. She was in eleventh grade at the time. Roan later described missing many childhood experiences in the "messy" beginning of her music career, including prom and her high school graduation.

Roan lived with her parents in Missouri through 2017, flying with them to Los Angeles or New York when necessary. In 2018 she moved to Los Angeles, where she was able to live openly as a queer woman for the first time.

Musical career

2017–2019: early releases 
On August 3, 2017, Roan released her first single, titled "Good Hurt". The song was reviewed favorably in Interview, in which an article praised her "striking maturity and surprisingly deep vocals." On September 22, 2017, she released an EP titled School Nights. Also in 2017, she went on her first concert tour, the Lay It On Me Tour headlined by Vance Joy.

In 2018, Roan moved to Los Angeles from Springfield, Missouri. She later described feeling "overwhelmed with complete love and acceptance" after the move, stating that it allowed her to begin "writing songs as the real me." From January to March 2018, she toured the United States with Declan McKenna.

2020–2021: "Pink Pony Club" 
Roan began working with Dan Nigro in early 2020. In April 2020, Roan released “Pink Pony Club”. The single was produced by Dan Nigro, and its music video was directed by Griffin Stoddard. A year after its release, Vulture described "Pink Pony Club" as "the Song of Summer 2021", calling it a "synthy infectious bangarang". The song tells the story of a girl who leaves the small town where she lives to become a stripper in West Hollywood. Roan has cited a visit to The Abbey, a gay bar in West Hollywood, as the inspiration for it. She told Cherwell that the song was about her desire to become a go-go dancer in Los Angeles, stating, "truthfully, I'm not confident enough to do that, so I wrote a song about it".

USA Today ranked the song third on a list of the "10 best songs of 2020", directly above "WAP" and below "Levitating"; an accompanying description characterized it as dance-pop that "earnestly [celebrates] queer culture, acceptance and chasing your dreams." By , the song had been streamed more than 10 million times on Spotify.

"Pink Pony Club" was not profitable enough for Atlantic, who dropped Roan from the label in 2020. Her partner of four years broke up with her the same week, and she spent the next two years working as a production assistant as well as a barista and nanny to support herself. In early 2021, the success of Olivia Rodrigo's song "Drivers License" shifted Dan Nigro's focus away from Roan as he worked on Sour with Rodrigo; Roan was unable to find a collaborator who she liked as much.

2022–present: Touring 
In March 2022, Roan released a single titled "Naked in Manhattan". The song was her first release in two years, and her first as an independent artist. It was described by NPR as a "queer girl bop" with lyrics that are "tender, nostalgic" and "flirty yet uncertain". Roan also was selected to open for Olivia Rodrigo at select performances of Rodrigo's "Sour Tour", and for Fletcher on her "Girl of My Dreams Tour".

In August 2022, she released a second independent single, "Femininomenon". Earmilk described the song as "so fun and loud but so intricate" and noted that it was different from Roan's past releases. Roan stated that the song, which was produced by Dan Nigro, was an attempt to "get away with being as ridiculous as I possibly can". An accompanying self-directed music video featured Roan riding a dirt bike.

Roan released another single, "Casual," in 2022 after beginning work on it with Dan Nigro in 2020. The song, which has lyrics dissing a romantic partner who refuses to commit, was inspired by a brief relationship Roan had during the pandemic that ended with her partner saying they had met someone else. Morgan St. Jean additionally worked on the song, which has a sad sound inspired by Mazzy Star and Radiohead.

In 2023, Roan kicked off a "Naked In North America Tour". She shared a theme with fans for each stop on the tour, suggesting outfits and providing makeup tutorials on social media, while making her own camp outfits herself. Concerts from the tour received positive reviews in The Harvard Crimson and Variety, with Jem Aswad describing it as a concert where "you recognize when a new-ish artist's career is about to blast off" similar to Billie Eilish in 2019 or Lorde in 2013 and characterizing Roan as a superstar. Roan additionally signed to Island Records, though the label did not officially announce her signing.

According to Rolling Stone, Roan's full-length debut album is set to be released in early 2023.

Style 
Chappell Roan writes most of her songs by herself, but has co-written some with other songwriters. After the release of her debut single "Good Hurt", her style was described in Interview as "pop sound [...] infused with a dark and unsettling tone that underscores her intense, somber lyrics". In 2018, she described her musical style as a mix of organic and electronic sounds, with a pop tone, and as "dark pop with ballad undertones." In her songs written while she was a teenager, according to Atwood Magazine, she "brought the hardship and turbulence of our teenaged years to life with a candidness and vividness seldom seen from her peers."

Roan has cited inspirations including the artist Abbey Watkins, the film The Beguiled, and musical artists alt-J, Stevie Nicks, Lorde, and Lana Del Rey. A 2017 review of her debut EP in PopCrush compared her sound to the latter two artists. She has also stated that the song "Stay" by Rihanna was what inspired her to begin writing music.

In 2023, a Variety article described Roan as "glammy and pop and embracing her femininity and shared Gen-Z generational experiences, and also very queer-positive".

Discography

Extended plays

Singles

Music videos

References

External links 
 Video: "Pink Pony Club"

Living people
Singer-songwriters from Missouri
People from Greene County, Missouri
1998 births
Atlantic Records artists
American women pop singers
21st-century American women singers
21st-century American singers
Queer singers
21st-century LGBT people
Island Records artists
Queer songwriters